The 2000 Ibero-American Championships in Athletics (Spanish: IX Campeonato Iberoamericano de Atletismo) was the ninth edition of the international athletics competition between Ibero-American nations which was held at the Estádio Célio de Barros in Rio de Janeiro, Brazil on 20 and 21 May. With a total of 308 athletes, the number of competitors was the lowest since 1990. The Spanish team (29 athletes) was much smaller than previous delegations as most of the Spaniards chose to focus on the 2000 Sydney Olympics instead. Other national teams used the competition as a chance to gain an Olympic qualifying mark.

The host nation Brazil easily topped the medal table by winning 18 gold medals and a total haul of 45 medals. The next best performing nation was Spain, which took six golds and 21 medals during the two-day championships. Cuba and Colombia won five golds each, while Argentina and Mexico had the third and fourth largest totals, with eleven and ten medals respectively. Fourteen of the 20 nations that participated reached the medal podium.

Brazil dominated the men's track events and Hudson de Souza completed an 800/1500 metres double. Cuban men provided the highlights of the men's field events, where Michael Calvo won the triple jump with a jump of 17.05 m and Emeterio González had a javelin throw over eighty metres (both championship marks). In the women's track events, reigning Olympic champion Fernanda Ribeiro broke the 5000 m championship record and Soraya Telles became the first female Ibero-American champion in the steeplechase (a contest which meant that the 44-event programme was equal between the sexes for the first time). The 10,000 m track walk saw Rosario Sánchez knock almost a minute of the meet record, while runner-up Geovana Irusta set a South American record behind her.

Although the level of performances was generally lower than at earlier editions, eight championships records were set. Two national records were also beaten; Elena Guerra improved the 1500 m Uruguayan record and Érika Olivera set a new Chilean record for the 5000 metres. The Brazilian men's 4×100 m relay team gave the performance of the competition with their winning time of 38.24 seconds, which was a South American record and an Ibero-American record.

Several athletes present at the competition went on to win medals on the Olympic stage later that year: Mexican Noé Hernández won the 20 km walk silver medal, Fernanda Ribeiro took an Olympic bronze over 10,000 m, while both the Brazilian and Cuban 4×100 m relay teams reached the Olympic podium. Future world champion Naide Gomes won São Tomé and Príncipe's first ever medal with her runner-up performance in the heptathlon.

Medal summary

Men

Women

Medal table

Participation
A total of 20 delegations were sent from the 28 member nations of the Asociación Iberoamericana de Atletismo, with 297 athletes being present at the competition. Recently joined members Angola, Cape Verde and Equatorial Guinea were all absent in 2000. Costa Rica, El Salvador and the Dominican Republic were other regular participants who did not take part in the championships.

 (26)
 (82)
 (3)
 (27)
 (13)
 (12)
 (5)
 (5)
 (1)
 (20)
 (4)
 (2)
 (5)
 (6)
 (11)
 (19)
 (1)
 (30)
 (8)
 (17)

References

Results
Ibero American Championships. GBR Athletics. Retrieved on 2012-01-08.
El Atletismo Ibero-Americano - San Fernando 2010 (pgs. 161-170). RFEA. Retrieved on 2012-01-08.

Ibero-American Championships in Athletics
Ibero-American Championships
2000 in Brazilian sport
International athletics competitions hosted by Brazil
International sports competitions in Rio de Janeiro (city)
Athletics in Rio de Janeiro (city)
May 2000 sports events in South America